The Republic of the Congo faces a number of ongoing health challenges.

The Human Rights Measurement Initiative finds that the Republic of the Congo is fulfilling 63.7% of what it should be fulfilling for the right to health based on its level of income. When looking at the right to health with respect to children, the Republic of the Congo achieves 90.3% of what is expected based on its current income. In regards to the right to health amongst the adult population, the country achieves only 75.9% of what is expected based on the nation's level of income.  The Republic of the Congo falls into the "very bad" category when evaluating the right to reproductive health because the nation is fulfilling only 25.0% of what the nation is expected to achieve based on the resources (income) it has available.

Health infrastructure 
Public expenditure health was at 8.9% of the GDP in 2004, whereas private expenditure on health related costs was at 1.3% of private income. Health expenditure was at US$30 per capita in 2004. There were 20 doctors per 100,000 persons in the early 2000s (decade).

There were 328 medical facilities in the Republic of the Congo in 2019.  Hospitals include the following:
Abala l’Hôpital de Base, Plateaux
Adolphe A Hôpital Général, Pointe Noire
Brazzaville Hospital, Brazzaville
Djambala l’Hôpital de Base, Plateaux
Dolisie l’Hôpital de Base, Niari
Dpolisie Hôpital Général, Niari
Ewo Hôpital, Cuvette-Ouest
Gamboma l’Hôpital de Base, Plateaux
Hospital 31 July D'Owando, Owando, Cuvette
Impfondo Hôpital Comboutique, Likouala Department
Kindamba Hôpital Comboutique, Pool Department
Kinkala Hôpital Comboutique, Pool Department
Linzolo l’Hôpital de Base, Pool Department
Loandjili Hôpital Général, Pointe Noire
Madingou Hospital Comboutique, Bouenza 
Makélékélé l’Hôpital de Base, Brazzaville
Mfouati Hospital Comboutique, Bouenza 
Military Hospital of Pointe-Noire, Pointe-Noire
Mindouli Hôpital Comboutique, Pool Department
Mouyondzi Hospital Comboutique, Bouenza 
Mpissa l’Hôpital de Base, Brazzaville
Nkayi Hôpital Comboutique, Bouenza
Okoyo Hôpital, Cuvette-Ouest
Ouesso l’Hôpital de Base, Sangha
Pioneer Christian Hospital, Impfondo, Likouala Department
Securex Hospital, Brazzaville
Sibiti Hôpital Comboutique, Lékoumou
Talagaï l’Hôpital de Base, Brazzaville
Tié-Tié l’Hôpital de Base, Pointe Noire
University Hospital of Brazzaville, Brazzaville

Health status

Life expectancy 
The 2014 CIA estimated average life expectancy in the Republic of the Congo was 58.52 years.

Endemic diseases 
The entire population of the Republic of the Congo is at high risk of malaria and transmission is intense all year round.  The annual reported number of malaria cases in 2012 was 117,640 with 623 deaths.

Yellow fever is also endemic to the Congo.

HIV/AIDS 
The 2013 HIV prevalence is at 3.4% among 15- to 49-year-olds.

Malnutrition 
A large proportion of the population is undernourished.

References